Aviaport is a rural locality (a selo), and one of three settlements in Sangar Urban Okrug of Kobyaysky District in the Sakha Republic, Russia, in addition to Sangar, the administrative center of the Urban Okrug and Smorodichny. Its population as of the 2002 Census was 371.

References

Notes

Sources
Official website of the Sakha Republic. Registry of the Administrative-Territorial Divisions of the Sakha Republic. Kobyaysky District. 

Rural localities in Kobyaysky District
Populated places on the Lena River